Dr. Juan Giambruno (born February 23, 1950 in Montevideo) is a Uruguayan cardiac surgeon at Universidad de la República, Montevideo.

His major work is a fully implantable artificial heart called CATO (Corazón Artificial Total Ortotópico - Spanish for Orthotopic Total Artificial Heart), which looks and acts like a real heart. In the development of the CATO, Giambruno worked together with an important team of Uruguayan scientists (cardiac surgeons, engineers, veterinarians and others). The CATO has been tested in cows with good results. Giambruno has earned international patents for his invention.
The main factor why the project hasn't been completed yet is the lack of economic resources. For years, the team of scientists has been working very hard and for free, in the living room of Giambruno's apartment in Montevideo.

References

Orthotopic Total Artificial Heart at FreePatentsOnline.com
Orthotopic Total Artificial Heart Patent

1950 births
Living people
People from Montevideo
Uruguayan cardiac surgeons
Uruguayan people of Italian descent